Adjassou-Linguetor is a loa with protruding eyes and a bad temper in Haitian Vodou. She governs spring water.

References

Haitian Vodou goddesses
Sea and river goddesses